A 1994 album from Leæther Strip, released by Zoth Ommog Records (cd zot 114). In a dramatic break with his usual aggressive industrial style, this album presents a gloomy electronic "symphony," inspired by the works of Stephen King, James Herbert, Dean R. Koontz and Clive Barker.

Track listing
"Serenade for the Dead" 3:53
"Black Widow's Kiss" 7:49
"Stillborn" 6:07
"The Return of the Evil One" 8:30
"Black Death" 4:41
"New Dark Ages" 6:31
"The Corridors of Sleep" 6:55
"The Awakening" 9:07
"Blood Lust" 6:14
"Corpus" 6:30
Extra tracks on double CD:
"Til Far"
"Reborn"
"Serenade for the Dead (Neophyte Mix by Synthetic)"
"Serenade For The Dead (Hypnosis Diagnosis Psychosis Editedmix by Synthetic)"

References

1994 albums
Leæther Strip albums
Zoth Ommog Records albums